This is a list of best-selling singles in the United States, some of which have been certified by the Recording Industry Association of America (RIAA). In music, a single is a song considered commercially viable enough by the artist and record company to be released separately from an album, usually featured on an album as well. For more information, see single.

The RIAA certifies a record only if that record company pays for its official certification; some companies do not consider this an important distinction and will not request certifications unless pressed by its active, still saleable artists. A full and complete list of RIAA-certified recordings would be a very incomplete list of popular American music.
The RIAA only certifies a particular recording of a song. Remixes, live and other versions count as separate.
Prior to 1989, physical singles were awarded with a Gold certification for shipments of 1,000,000 units and a Platinum certification for shipments of 2,000,000 units. For certification dates since January 1, 1989, a Gold award represented shipments of 500,000 units and a Platinum award represented shipments of 1,000,000 units.
Since May 9, 2013, RIAA certifications for singles in the "digital" category include on-demand audio and/or video song streams in addition to downloads.  The current formula since February 1, 2016 is 150 on-demand streams = 1 song download.
Physical sales figures backed by RIAA certifications may be inaccurate as physical singles can be "overcertified" (sell less copies than were shipped to stores) or "undercertified" (sell beyond their current certification level and not receive a new certification).

Physical singles 

All of these physical singles have sold over four million copies according to either reliable third-party claims or RIAA multi-platinum certifications.

Digital singles 
All of these digital singles been certified at least 6× platinum by the RIAA or have sold more than 6 million copies. Digital singles are listed according to certifications first, and then according to actual sales figures. Since May 2013, RIAA certification for digital singles include downloads and on-demand streaming. Thus the actual sales figures will be different from the amounts specified by the RIAA.

11× Platinum or higher

Diamond certification 
Adapted from the RIAA website.

9× Platinum

8× Platinum

7× Platinum

6× Platinum or more than 6 million in sales

Achievements 
 Bruno Mars is the first and only artist to have six singles surpass 10 million units.
 As of October 2022, Eminem is RIAA's top awarded digital singles artist.Rihanna was the first artist to cross 100 million cumulative singles sales in 2015. She held the title as the only artist with over 100 million cumulative singles sales from July 2015 until June 2017 when Taylor Swift crossed the mark as well.
 After his sudden death, Michael Jackson became the first artist in digital history to sell one million downloads in a week, with a record-breaking 2.6 million downloads of his songs.
 XXXTentacion, Juice WRLD And Lil Uzi Vert are the only artists within the emo genre to receive a Diamond certification.
 Justin Bieber is the youngest artist in history to surpass 100 million cumulative single sales as a lead, at the age of 27.
 Katy Perry is the first artist to top the 5-million mark with six songs—"Hot n Cold", "California Gurls", "Firework", "E.T.", "Roar" and "Dark Horse". In October 2015, Perry also became the first artist to top the 6-million mark with three different songs.
 Lady Gaga's debut single, "Just Dance", is the best-selling debut single by any artist in the United States, with over 7.2 million copies sold as of February 2018. Gaga is also the first artist to pass 7 million downloads with two songs, with "Just Dance" and "Poker Face".
 Bruno Mars, The Weeknd, Post Malone, Justin Bieber, Katy Perry, Ed Sheeran, Eminem, Maroon 5, Drake, Imagine Dragons, Cardi B, and The Chainsmokers are the only artists to have at least three diamond-certified songs: 
 Bruno Mars with his songs "Just the Way You Are", "Uptown Funk", "That's What I Like", "When I Was Your Man", "Locked Out of Heaven", and "Grenade"
 The Weeknd with his songs "Starboy", "Blinding Lights", "The Hills", "Can't Feel My Face", and "Earned It"
 Post Malone with his songs "White Iverson", "Rockstar", "Sunflower", "Congratulations", and "Psycho"
 Justin Bieber with his songs "Baby", "Despacito", and "Sorry"
 Eminem with his songs "Lose Yourself", "Love the Way You Lie", and "Not Afraid"
 Katy Perry with her songs "Dark Horse", "Firework", and "Roar"
 Ed Sheeran with his songs "Thinking Out Loud", "Shape of You", and "Perfect"
 Maroon 5 with their songs "Moves Like Jagger", "Sugar", and "Girls Like You"
 Drake with his songs "God's Plan", "Hotline Bling", "One Dance", and "Life Is Good"
 Imagine Dragons with their songs "Radioactive", "Demons", "Believer", and "Thunder"
 Cardi B with her songs "Bodak Yellow", "Girls Like You", and "I Like It"
 The Chainsmokers with their songs "Closer", "Don't Let Me Down", and "Something Just Like This"
 Mariah Carey's "All I Want for Christmas is You" is the first-holiday song to receive a Diamond certification.
 Drake would technically have five but his performance isn't credited on Sicko Mode due to Astroworld having surprise features.

See also 

 RIAA certification
 List of highest-certified music artists in the United States
 List of best-selling singles
 List of best-selling singles of 2014 in the United States
 List of best-selling albums in the United States

Notes

References

External links 
 RIAA Website
 Detailed List of Artists with Most Singles Certification Units
 Billboard Magazine - a magazine that publishes weekly music rankings

United States
Best-selling singles
American music industry